The Emma Laaksonen Award is an ice hockey trophy awarded by the Finnish Ice Hockey Association to the fair play player of the year of the Naisten Liiga, called the  until 2017. The award recognizes a player who best contributes to the scoring of their team while "playing fair," that is to say, while incurring very few penalties. Winners typically exceed one point per game and are issued fewer than ten penalty minutes (PIM) over a full season. It is named after defenceman Emma Terho (née Laaksonen), former captain of the Finnish women's national ice hockey team and general manager of Kiekko-Espoo Naiset. Despite being named after a defenceman, it has only ever been awarded to forwards.

The trophy was first awarded in 2011, to Christine Posa of the Espoo Blues. Saila Saari is the sole player to have received the trophy twice, first in 2013, while playing with JYP Jyväskylä, and again in 2018, while playing with Oulun Kärpät. Emilia Vesa, recipient for the 2018–19 season, is the only honoree to have won the trophy while scoring less than one point per game. The  trophy holder is Emmanuelle Passard, who won the award while playing with HIFK Helsinki for the 2021–22 season. A French national, Passard is the first international player to win the award and also the first to be so honored while incurring zero penalty minutes in a season.

Award winners 

Source: Elite Prospects

All time award recipients

References

Naisten Liiga (ice hockey) trophies and awards
Sportsmanship trophies and awards